Yulin may refer to the following places in China:

Cities and prefectures
Yulin, Guangxi (玉林市), a prefecture-level city in Guangxi
Yulin, Shaanxi (榆林市), a prefecture-level city in Shaanxi
Yulin Prefecture (鬱林州), a prefecture between the 7th and 20th centuries in modern Guangxi

Subdistricts
Yulin Subdistrict, Fushun (榆林街道), in Xinfu District, Fushun, Liaoning
Yulin Subdistrict, Chengdu (玉林街道), in Wuhou District, Chengdu, Sichuan
Yulin Subdistrict, Xinchang County (羽林街道), in Xinchang County, Zhejiang

Towns
Yulin, Lanxi County (榆林镇), in Lanxi County, Heilongjiang
Yulin, Inner Mongolia (榆林镇), in Saihan District, Hohhot, Inner Mongolia
Yulin, Jilin (榆林镇), in Ji'an, Jilin
Yulin, Sichuan (玉林镇), in Santai County, Sichuan

Townships
Yulin Township, Chongqing (鱼鳞乡), in Wuxi County, Chongqing
Yulin Township, Gansu (榆林乡), in Linxia County, Gansu
Yulin Township, Heilongjiang (育林乡), in Mingshui County, Heilongjiang
Yulin Township, Xuchang (榆林乡), in Xuchang, Henan
Yulin Township, Xinxiang (榆林乡), in Yanjin County, Henan

Other
Yulin Caves
Yulin Naval Base (榆林海军基地)
Harris Yulin (American actor, born 1937)